Good Favour is a 2017 internationally co-produced drama film directed by Rebecca Daly. It was screened in the Contemporary World Cinema section at the 2017 Toronto International Film Festival.

Cast
 Alexandre Willaume as Hans
 Clara Rugaard as Shosanna
 Victoria Mayer as Maria
 Vincent Romeo as Tom

Accolades
Good Favour won the Audience Award, National Competition, at the 2019 Brussels International Film Festival (BRIFF).

References

External links
 
 
 

2017 films
2017 drama films
Irish drama films
English-language Irish films
English-language Belgian films
English-language Danish films
English-language Dutch films
2010s English-language films